Notela is a monotypic moth genus of the family Notodontidae (the prominents). Its only species, Notela jaliscana, is found in North America. Both the genus and species were first described by William Schaus in 1901

The MONA or Hodges number for Notela jaliscana is 7960.

References

Further reading

 
 
 
 
 
 
 
 
 

Notodontidae
Articles created by Qbugbot
Moths described in 1901
Monotypic moth genera